The discography of country music singer-songwriter Sammi Smith consists of thirteen studio albums, four compilation albums and forty-three singles.

Studio albums

1970s 
{| class="wikitable plainrowheaders" style="text-align:center;"
|-
! rowspan="2" style="width:18em;"| Title
! rowspan="2" style="width:18em;"| Details
! colspan="2"| Peak chartpositions
|- style="font-size:smaller;"
! width="45"| US Country
! width="45"| US
|-
! scope="row"| Help Me Make It Through the Night[A] <small>
| 
 Release date: September 1970
 Label: Mega Records
| 1
| 33
|-
! scope="row"| Lonesome
| 
 Release date: September 1971
 Label: Mega Records
| 15
| 191
|-
! scope="row"| Something Old, Something New,Something Blue
| 
 Release date: April 1972
 Label: Mega Records
| 17
| —
|-
! scope="row"| The Toast of '45
| 
 Release date: March 1973
 Label: Mega Records
| 43
| —
|-
! scope="row"| The Rainbow in Daddy's Eyes
| 
 Release date: April 1974
 Label: Mega Records
| —
| —
|-
! scope="row"| Sunshine
| 
 Release date: 1975
 Label: Mega Records
| —
| —
|-
! scope="row"| Today I Started Loving You Again
| 
 Release date: April 1975
 Label: Mega Records
| 19
| —
|-
! scope="row"| As Long as There's Sunday 
| 
 Release date: 1976
 Label: Elektra Records
| 43
| —
|-
! scope="row"| Mixed Emotions
| 
 Release date: 1977
 Label: Elektra Records
| 47
| —
|-
! scope="row"| New Winds, All Quadrants 
| 
 Release date: 1978
 Label: Elektra Records
| —
| —
|-
! scope="row"| Girl Hero
| 
 Release date: 1979
 Label: Cyclone Records
| —
| —
|-
| colspan="4" style="font-size: 8pt"| "—" denotes releases that did not chart
|-
|}

 1980s–1990s 

 Compilation albums 

Singles
1960s–1970s

1980s–1990s

Notes

A^' Help Me Make It Through the Night also peaked at No. 51 on the RPM'' Canadian Albums chart.

References

Country music discographies
Discographies of American artists